Apprentice is a point-and-click adventure game released on Windows by American studio Herculean Effort Productions as freeware in 2003. It was created using the open source development tool, Adventure Game Studio.

Gameplay
The player takes control of Mortimer "Pib" Pibsworth, a young apprentice who always wanted to become a wizard. The game begins with a dream sequence in which he is confronted by Lord Ironcrow, the ruler of the region. Lord Ironcrow attempts to persuade him to become a soldier, but Pib refuses causing him to wake up, screaming. His teacher returns to check up on Pib and informs him that he prepared to learn his very first spell, but first he must find the proper ingredients.

Development and release
The game began as a side project while the developers worked on The Find, introducing the player to the game world and some of its characters. Therefore, the game was criticised for its short length and a lack of any real storyline. Furthermore, the dream sequence at the beginning of the game bears no relevance to the rest of the game. Nevertheless, Apprentice was praised for its high production values and is even mentioned as a good example of a game created with Adventure Game Studio in the book Gaming Hacks published by O'Reilly Media. The game won four AGS Awards in 2003 for Best Room Art, Best Character Art, Best Animation and Best Music.

The first version of Apprentice was released on July 10, 2003. The first bug fix version, which also added a bonus puzzle to the game, was released on the 28th. Two years later, on May 29, 2005, HEP released a Deluxe version of the game, which improved animations and music and added voice overs to the game.

The Apprentice series is planned as a trilogy. The sequel Apprentice II: The Knight's Move was released on July 29, 2004. The release date of the last game in the series, Apprentice III: Checkmate! is unknown.

Herculean Effort Productions also released a commercial superhero point-and-click adventure game called Super Jazz Man on December 21, 2006.

References

External links
Herculean Effort Productions
Information about and free download of Apprentice I (original, not Deluxe edition) on AdventureGameStudio.co.uk (home of Adventure Game Studio)
Information about and free download of Apprentice I Deluxe on AdventureGameStudio.co.uk
Information about and free download of Apprentice II: The Knight's Move on AdventureGameStudio.co.uk
Information about Herculean Effort Productions and their video games on GiantBomb.com
Information about Herculean Effort Productions and reviews of Apprentice I and Apprentice II on Reloaded.org
Apprentice Deluxe review at Adventure Lantern
Apprentice II review at Adventure Lantern
Apprentice II review at Bonafide Reviews
Apprentice Deluxe review at Gnome's Lair
Apprentice and Apprentice II mentioned on About.com
Apprentice 2003 awards at AGS
Apprentice 2003 nominations at Adventure Gamers
Apprentice II 2004 award at Adventure Gamers
Apprentice Deluxe review at Obsolete Gamer

2003 video games
Adventure games
Adventure Game Studio games
Point-and-click adventure games
Video games developed in the United States
Windows games
Windows-only games
AGS Award winners